Monkey Planet is a British documentary television series that was first broadcast on BBC One on 2 April 2014. Presented by George McGavin, the series was produced by the BBC Natural History Unit and Animal Planet.

Production
The BBC announced the television series on 16 January 2014. The three-part series shows primate family success and was filmed across the globe. Filming took place in South Africa, Uganda, Ethiopia, Congo, Thailand and Japan. The executive producer is Chris Cole and producer is Jo Shinner.

Episodes

Home media
DVD and Blu-ray Disc editions were released in the UK on 2 June 2014.

References

External links
 
 
 

2014 British television series debuts
2014 British television series endings
BBC television documentaries
Documentary films about nature
English-language television shows